Gian Singh Naqqash (1883 – 1953) was a Punjabi artist. He was a fresco painter and worked at the Golden Temple for more than 33 years. He is particularly known for painting in the style that is known as the Sikh School of Painting.

Biography 
Gian Singh was born in 1883 in Amritsar, British Punjab (now Punjab, India). His father was Charan Singh.

Gian Singh had three sons. His eldest son Sunder Singh was martyred in the 1919 Jallianwala Bagh massacre, when he was only 17 years. His younger son Jagat Singh went on to become an ayurveda expert while his youngest son G.S. Sohan Singh followed Gian Singh's footsteps became a painter himself.

Books 

 Naqqashi Darpan
 Visva Karma Darpan
 Gian Chitravali: Masterpieces of the Late Bhai Gian Singh Naqqash (written by G.S. Sohan Singh) - 1956

Honors 

 Siropa - Shiromani Gurdwara Parbandhak Committee (1949)

References 

1883 births
1953 deaths
Male artists from Punjab, India
Artists from Amritsar
Artists from British India